{{DISPLAYTITLE:C25H32N2O2}}
The molecular formula C25H32N2O2 (molar mass: 392.53 g/mol, exact mass: 392.2464 u) may refer to:

 Dextromoramide
 Levomoramide
 Racemoramide (or simply moramide)